John Aiken is an American basketball coach who was last the head men's basketball coach at McNeese State.

Coaching career
Aiken began his coaching career in his native Maine assisting at Greater Portland Christian School and Cheverus High School, the latter under former Boston University men's basketball coach Bob Brown, the father of Brett Brown. He'd get his start in the collegiate ranks as an assistant coach at the University of New England before becoming an assistant coach at Belhaven. After serving in the assistant role for four seasons, Aiken was elevated to head coach where he guided the Blazers to a 30–33 record in two seasons.

Moving into the Division I ranks, Aiken joined Heath Schroyer's staff at UT Martin, and followed it up with an assistant coaching stint at Nicholls State. He'd reunite with Schroyer at McNeese State as an assistant coach, and on March 11, 2021, Aiken would be elevated to head coach after Schroyer took on the position of athletic director full time. He was fired on March 8, 2023.

Head coaching record

NAIA

NCAA DI

References

Living people
American men's basketball coaches
McNeese Cowboys basketball coaches
UT Martin Skyhawks men's basketball coaches
Nicholls Colonels men's basketball coaches
Basketball coaches from Maine
Sportspeople from Portland, Maine
Year of birth missing (living people)